María Ólafsdóttir (born 2 February 1993), known outside Iceland as María Ólafs, is an Icelandic singer, musician, and actress. She represented Iceland in the Eurovision Song Contest 2015 with the song "Unbroken", but failed to qualify for the final.

Discography

EPs

Singles

As lead artist

As featured artist

See also
Iceland in the Eurovision Song Contest 2015

References

External links

 
 
 

1993 births
Maria Olafsdottir
Maria Olafsdottir
Maria Olafsdottir
Eurovision Song Contest entrants of 2015
Maria Olafsdottir
Maria Olafsdottir
Living people
Maria Olafsdottir
Maria Olafsdottir